Kyle Spencer (born 26 January 1976) is a male former tennis player from the United Kingdom.

Spencer represented the United Kingdom in the doubles competition at the 2000 Summer Olympics in Sydney, partnering Barry Cowan. The pair was eliminated in the first round.

Spencer's highest ranking in singles was World No. 953, which he reached on 21 September 1998. His highest doubles ranking was World No. 126, which he reached on 17 July 2000.

ATP career finals

Doubles: 1 (1 runner-up)

ATP Challenger and ITF Futures finals

Doubles: 9 (2–7)

Performance timeline

Doubles

External links
 
 
 

1976 births
Living people
Olympic tennis players of Great Britain
Tennis players at the 2000 Summer Olympics
English male tennis players
British male tennis players
Tennis people from the West Midlands (county)